Romero Federico Saenz Quimbo (born December 12, 1969), better known as Miro Quimbo, is a Filipino politician who served as the representative for Marikina's 2nd congressional district from 2010 to 2019.

Education
Quimbo spent the first two years of elementary school at the Sacred Heart College in Catbalogan, Samar. He transferred to the Marist School in Marikina where he eventually finished his elementary and secondary education.

He enrolled at the University of the Philippines Diliman in Quezon City for his undergraduate and law degrees. At UP, he was one of the most recognized and accomplished student leaders. He was a member of the UP Student Council for a number of years, captain of the UP Law Debate Team, and a member of the UP Alpha Sigma Fraternity.

Professional life
He started his legal practice with the law firm of Poblador Bautista and Reyes, one of the noted litigation firms in the Philippines.

He would join the Pag-IBIG Fund in 2001 as its Deputy Chief Executive Officer. In 2002, he was appointed as head of the same agency until end of 2008. During that period, the Fund became the most profitable government corporation and was consistently listed in the top ten corporations in the Philippines. In 2008, the Pag-IBIG Fund was awarded the United Nations Scroll of Honour for its outstanding and innovative housing programs, a first for any Philippine government agency. That same year, the Fund was given an AAA corporate rating, a distinction given to a government corporation for the first time.

Ten Outstanding Young Men of 2007
He was recognized by the Philippine Jaycees as one of the Ten Outstanding Young Men of 2007 for his outstanding leadership of the Pag-IBIG Fund.

Political career
From 2010 to 2019, he served as the representative for the 2nd District of Marikina for three consecutive terms. He was preceded by Del de Guzman, who won as mayor of Marikina in 2010, and was succeeded by his spouse, Stella Quimbo.

Personal life
Quimbo is married to Stella Alabastro Quimbo and has 4 children – 3 sons and a daughter.

See also
Marikina
House of Representatives of the Philippines
Legislative districts of Marikina

References

Official Website
Marikina Government
Pag-IBIG Fund.gov

1969 births
Deputy Speakers of the House of Representatives of the Philippines
Liberal Party (Philippines) politicians
Living people
Members of the House of Representatives of the Philippines from Marikina
People from Catbalogan
People from Marikina
University of the Philippines Diliman alumni